The 2004 CONMEBOL Pre-Olympic Tournament began on 7 January 2004, and is the 12th CONMEBOL Pre-Olympic Tournament. This was the 4th tournament is open to players under the age of 23 without any other restriction. There is no qualification stage and all 10 member of CONMEBOL automatic qualified. The winner and the runner-up qualified for 2004 Summer Olympics. Players born on or after 1 January 1981 were eligible to play in this competition.

Squads

Matches

First stage

Group A

Group B

Playoffs

Final stage

Scorers

5 goals
 Sergio Herrera

3 goals
 Osmar Ferreyra
 Luciano Figueroa
 Luis González
 Diego
 Marcel
 Robinho
 Jean Beausejour
 Franklin Salas
 José Paolo Guerrero

2 goals
 Gonzalo Rodríguez
 Juan Carlos Arce
 José Alfredo Castillo
 Alex
 Dudu
 Mark González

 Joel Soto
 José Luis Villanueva
 Jhonny Baldeón
 Roberto Miña
 Fredy Bareiro
 Diego Figueredo
 Julio González
 Wilmer Aguirre
 Giancarlo Maldonado

1 goal
 César Delgado
 Alejandro Domínguez
 Leandro Fernández
 Carlos Tevez
 Jorge Ortiz
 Dagoberto
 Maicon
 Rubén Bascuñán
 Luis Pedro Figueroa

 Braulio Leal
 Rodrigo Millar
 Jorge Valdivia
 Martín Arzuaga
 Álvaro Domínguez
 Félix Borja
 Luis Checa
 José Luis Perlaza
 Jorge Achucarro
 José Devaca
 Osvaldo Díaz
 Pablo Giménez
 Aureliano Torres
 Alberto Junior Rodríguez
 Sebastián García
 Rubén Olivera
 Nicolás Vigneri

Own goal
 Aquivaldo Mosquera (playing against Argentina)

External links
CONMEBOL

2004
2004
Olym
Oly